Phyllaphis is a genus of aphids in the family Aphididae. There are at least four described species in Phyllaphis.

Species
These four species belong to the genus Phyllaphis:
 Phyllaphis fagi Richards, 1973 c g b (woolly beech aphid)
 Phyllaphis fagifoliae Takahashi, R., 1919 c g
 Phyllaphis grandifoliae Richards, 1973 c g b (woolly beech aphid)
 Phyllaphis nigra Ashmead, 1881 c g
Data sources: i = ITIS, c = Catalogue of Life, g = GBIF, b = Bugguide.net

References

Further reading

External links

 

Hemiptera genera
Phyllaphidinae